Muhammad al-Ṭāhir ibn ʿĀshūr (full name  Muḥammad al-Ṭāhir ibn Muḥammad ibn Muḥammad al-Ṭāhir ibn ʿĀshūr;
1879 – August 1973) was a graduate of University of Ez-Zitouna and a well known Islamic scholar. He studied classical Islamic scholarship with reform-minded scholars. He became a judge then Shaykh al-Islām in 1932. He was a writer and author on the subject of reforming Islamic education and jurisprudence. He is best remembered for his Qur'anic exegesis, al-Tahrir wa'l-tanwir (The Verification and Enlightenment).

Early life
Muhammad al-Tahir ibn Ashur was born in Tunis in 1879 to an affluent family and died in 1973 at age 94. He was of Andalusian origin. The family had shown dedication to the pursuit of knowledge for generations. His grandfather was especially renowned. When he entered Zaytuna, care was made to provide him the best teachers. He was a teacher at Zaytuna all his life. His masterpiece is the Maqasid al-Shari'ah al-Islamiyyah, the Intents, or Higher Goals of Islamic Law, published in 1946. He is famous for rejecting Habib Bourguiba's (president of Tunisia) request for a fatwa to justify abandoning the fast of the month of Ramadan because it harmed productivity. He responded by stating "Prescribed for you is fasting", and announced on the radio, "God has spoken the truth and Bourguiba has spoken falsehood." He was, as a result, dismissed from his post.

Influenced by a visit to Tunisia by Muhammad Abduh, Ibn Ashur combined knowledge of the classics with a desire to revive Islamic civilization. He positioned himself as a bridge between the classical Islamic legal heritage and the needs of a modern world. His references to the great works of law are respectful, but he does not hesitate to point out shortcomings. Responding to modern challenges to Islamic traditions, Ibn Ashur called for substantive reforms in Islamic education. His work on the ultimate purposes of Shari'a represented an attempt to revive the maqasid theory of Shatibi and an effort to renew Islamic legal theory.

Personal views
Ibn Ashur intended his work to be relevant for the modern world. He claimed that the discipline of usul al-fiqh had reached its limits and become over-burdened with methodological technicalities. Appropriate legal responses to situations in the modern world cannot be found by delving deeper and deeper into the meaning of a word.

Scholarly work
Ibn Ashur asserted the view that language is fundamentally ambiguous and is not enough to determine the intent of a speaker. Further, while written words are less subject to distortion, the spoken word is actually more likely to convey the speaker's intent. The entire field surrounding the word must be considered. In contrast, the return of generations to Medina to assess the meaning of a statement shows the importance of understanding context.

Ibn Ashur questioned the juridical weight of an isolated hadith in determining legislation. Instead, legislative value should be sought from the totality of shari'ah. He suggested that comments seemingly to the contrary from Imam al-Shafi'i and Imam Ahmad ibn Hanbal must be distortions of their work. He worried that taking a solitary (ahad) hadith in isolation from the body of shari'ah would end the quest for understanding in context. Preferring a solitary hadith over a rational deduction based on context would be problematic. Ibn Ashur believes that al-Shafi'i was misunderstood as accepting a solitary hadith over the larger context and that Ahmad ibn Hanbal was misrepresented as accepting a weak hadith over qiyas. Ibn Ashur says that a weak hadith is open to error, and qiyas is open to error, but in addition, the weak hadith may be a lie and the consequence of using it would be worse than using qiyas.

Ibn Ashur claimed that the basis of shari'ah must be rational. He said, "One of the greatest things required by the universality of the shari'ah is that its rules be equal for all the communities following it to the utmost extent possible, because similarity in the flow of rules and laws is a help for achieving group unity in the community."

Because the shari'ah is universal, it must not be restricted to a single culture. The shari'ah came down in the Arabic language to the Arabic people, and therefore its coloring and style are Arabic. However, its intent is universal and so must be intelligible everywhere. This tells us that the law is based on reason. For example, the mandate of keeping raisin juice in certain kinds of containers comes from the fact that in the heat of the Hijaz the juice would quickly ferment. In cold climates, that would not apply. In fact, to stubbornly hold onto superficialities without understanding the intent is to "expose the shari'ah to being dismissed disdainfully."

Ibn Ashur saw this literal-mindedness to be represented by the Zahiri position. His strongest argument against it is that the literal occasions that the Zahiri hold onto are quite limited, but that people around the world encounter many more. Therefore, the maqasid of the shari'ah must be engaged.

Ibn Ashur called for ijtihad in the strongest terms. He said, "Ijtihad is a collective duty (fard al-kifayah) on the community according to the measure of need in the community's countries and situations." He chastised the Muslims for neglecting ijtihad despite the fact that the capacity and means are available. He wanted to see Muslims coming forth to practice ijtihad for the global community. It was clear to him that the lack of ijtihad had severe consequences. He called for a group of mujtahids from countries around the world, from different madhahib (schools), to address the needs of the community, as the basis for a renewal of civilisation.

Ibn 'Ashur on Qur'an 2:256
One of the most fascinating approaches to the issue of coherence between Qur'an 2:256 (no coercion in religion), 3:83 (willingly or unwillingly), 9:29 (pay the Jizyah), 9:73 (strive against the disbelievers and the hypocrites) and 2:193 (and fight them until there is no fitnah), is that of Ibn 'Ashur. He understands verses 9:73 and 2:193, and the Hadith (I have been commanded (by Allah) to fight people until they testify that there is no true god except Allah), as connected to the fighting with the aggressive Arab pagans and after the conquest of Mecca (Fath Makkah) verse 2:256 came into force. this is opposed to the opinion that 2:256 is seen as abrogated (Mansukh) by 9:5/73, 66:9 or specific (Khass) for the People of the Book. However, in Ibn 'Ashur's interpretation, 9:73/66:9, 2:193 and the mentioned Hadith is specific for the historical struggle with the Arab pagans and after the conquest of Mecca verse 2:256 became absolute and decisive in meaning (Mutlaq wa Muhkam) and thus cannot be abrogated. Verse 9:29 took away any option of fighting unbelievers. He thus turns the classical reading around, while still connecting the Prophetic history (Sallallahu 'alaihi Wa Salam) with the Qur'anic text in a more logical way. He historicizes Qur'anic verses the same way classical scholars have done through the concept of abrogation (Naskh) and occasions of revelation (Asbab al-Nuzul), but takes the Maqasid al-Shari'ah (welfare objectives of the Islamic law) into account where a restriction on freedom of religion would violate the preservation of religion and intellect (Hifz al-Din wa al-'Aql).

Honours
 Grand officier of Nichan Iftikhar (Tunisia)
 Grand officier of the Order of Civil Merit of Tunisia

Acknowledgement 
 Member of the Arab Academy of Damascus 
 Member of the Academy of the Arabic Language in Cairo

Works
Ibn 'Ashur wrote more than thirty books, amongst them:
 (ar) The Objectives of Islamic Law
 (ar) The Foundations of the Social system in Islam
 (ar) Is Not Dawn Close ?
 (ar) Waqf and its effects in Islam
 (ar) The birth of the Prophet Sallallahu 'alaihi Wa Salam
 (ar) Investigations and perspectives in the Qur'an and Sunnah
 (ar) The Principles of Islamic Jurisprudence
 (ar) Treaty of Islamic Jurisprudence
 (ar) Opinions and Ijtihad
 (ar) The Origins of Progress in Islam
 (ar) Fatāwā
 (ar) The Verification and Enlightenment : a 30 volume exegesis of the Qur'an.

See also

 List of Ash'aris and Maturidis

References

Sources
 Ibn Ashur: Treatise on Maqasid Al-Shariah, translated from the Arabic and annotated by Mohamed El-Tahir El-Mesawi
 Muhammad al-Tahir ibn Ashur on IAIS

External links
 Ibn ʿAshur: The Career And Thought Of A Contemporary Reformist ʿAlim
 islamonline web site about ibn ashur 

1879 births
1973 deaths
Asharis
Mujaddid
Muslim reformers
20th-century Muslim scholars of Islam
Quranic exegesis scholars
Tunisian Maliki scholars
People from Tunis
Tunisian Muslim theologians
Shaykh al-Islāms